Llena is a surname. Notable people with the surname include:

Antoni Llena (born 1942), Spanish artist
Enrique Llena (born 1961), Spanish footballer and manager

See also
La Llena (disambiguation)
Luna Llena (disambiguation)
Llenas